Kale Wala is a small village located west of Gill Wala and east of Chabba Cheema, Wazirabad Tehsil, Gujranwala District, Punjab, Pakistan. For education in the village a Government Girls Primary School (GGPS), Kale Wala is functional, by Government of Punjab, Pakistan under Board of Intermediate and Secondary Education, Gujranwala.

See also 

 Saide Wali
 Gurali (Pakistan)
 Iftikhar Nagar Cheema

References 

Villages in Gujranwala District